The Cork and Youghal Railway (C&YR) was a company that built and operated a short  railway built in the early 1860s in Ireland linking Cork with Youghal, a small resort with harbour at the mouth of the Munster Blackwater.   There was an additional  branch to Cobh (Queenstown), a deepwater port in Cork Harbour associated with transatlantic liners.  The railway was forced into administration within a few short years due to the bankruptcy of major shareholder David Leopold Lewis and was taken over by the much larger Great Southern and Western Railway (GS&WR).  The branch to Cobh became the main line and by the late 1980s was the only part of the previously extensive rail network around Cork City to remain operational apart from the main line to Dublin. 2009 saw the Youghal branch re-open to  while the remainder of the route is being converted to a greenway in the 2020s.

History

C&YR
A group company called the Cork and Waterford Railway was established in the 1840 which explored a route between the two major south coast cities via Youghal and Dungarvan.  Had this come to fruition it has been commented the traffic levels on the line would likely have been significantly larger.

The rights to build a line from Cork to Youghal was established in law in 1854.  The C&YR was initially under the chairmanship of Isaac Butt, member of Parliament for Youghal, and leader of the Irish Party in the House of Commons. Little progress seems to have been made until the arrival of a financier from London, David Leopold Lewis.  Lewis had grand plans to turn Youghal into a "Brighton-by-the-sea" resort and approached the project with gusto, not only buying C&YR shares at a 40% premium, acquiring a pleasure steamer for trips up the Munster Blackwater, and culminating in the purchasing of most of the town of Youghal from William Cavendish, 7th Duke of Devonshire in 1861.

Butt was replaced in 1959 by Cusack Patrick Roney who had board level experience with the Cambridge and Lincoln Railway Company and Eastern Counties Railway in England; and the Grand Trunk Railway Company of Canada.  Murray and McNeil credit Roney with keeping the C&YR enterprise going despite the activities of Lewis; though Roney does seem to extol the railway; Youghal with its rejunvination by Lewis; and the Lewis pleasure steamship trip up the Blackwater in his book How to Spend a Month in Ireland.

Passengers were conveyed the two miles from King Street in Cork to Dunkettle by horse omnibus, an extra 40 minutes being allowed. Services extended to Youghal from 23 May 1860. Following the laying of the permanent way the first scheduled first steam-hauled train for Youghal departed Cork Summerhill on 30 December 1861 at 09:45.

The progress on the line to Cobh was delayed by The Admiralty being concerned that the six span steel bridge to Fota Island and the Belvelly bridge to Great Island would be a hindrance to navigation.  Transatlantic liners had been calling at Cobh since the 1850s and the traffic on the Cobh branch was to exceed than on the Youghal line.  The C&YR seems to have been marketed as the Cork, Youghal and Queenstown Direct after this time, and seems to have been successful in capturing traffic from the Cork, Blackrock and Passage Railway and their ferries.

Lewis's financial over-ambition caught up with him in 1865, he was to be made bankrupt for the third time, owing £850,000.  His only assets being C&YR shares this contributed to the GS&WR taking over operation of the railway from 1865 and buying it completely in 1866 for £310,000.  Lewis was sent to gaol and died in 1868 with this emerging to have been his third bankruptcy.  Roney also was to die in 1868 before he was 60.

GS&WR
The GS&WR found the C&YR to be in a run-down condition but took steps to improve it to GS&WR standards, to the extent shareholders complained about the expenditures. The line to Youghal then became the branch and the mileposts measured from Cobh Junction as zero. The GS&WR also paid substantially for a deep water harbour at Cobh.

From 1 July 1876 the Dublin to Cork daily mail train was extended to Cobh.  It was known as the "American Mail" as it was possible to take mail from liner, transport it to Dublin for the steam Packets to mainland Britain and train to London, thereby cutting the delivery time by a day.

As with other railways Civil unrest took its toll with the bridges to Great Island destroyed on 8 August 1922.  The Daytime mail trains were stopped from running through to Cobh after this point.

GSR, CIÉ and Irish Rail
The lines passed to the Great Southern Railways (GSR) with the amalgamation of 1925.  Nationalisation into CIÉ followed some twenty years later in 1945 with control passing to Iarnród Éireann (Irish Rail) in 1987.  Up to the 1960s Cobh had been the main departure point for Irish Emigrants to America, thereafter transatlantic air travel began to dominate and the liner trade died off.  More recently this has been replaced to some extent by Cruise Ship tourists.

The last regular scheduled passenger train between Cobh Junction to Youghal ran on 2 February 1963 and was subsequently replaced by a bus service. In July 2015 Irish Rail indicated they had no intention of re-opening to Youghal as funds would be better spent on the existing network. They indicated they supported a greenway as it would free them from existing maintenance costs whilst retaining a license to re-open the route in the unlikely event that became an option. By April 2020 a €15 million euro project to open the Midleton to Youghal Greenway had begun but was being delayed by the COVID-19 pandemic.

Route
The initial main line runs in a relatively straight direction from Cork to Youghal some,  to the east.

Bridges and other works take the railway via the small Harpers Island and larger Fota Island to the port town of Cobh on Great Island, the largest island in Cork Harbour.

Rolling stock

The C&YR bought seven  with  driving wheels from Neilson and Company, and also three of the  configuration with  driving wheels from the same company. All passed to the GS&WR on takeover.  The company commenced with eight passenger coaches from Ashburys, Manchester, England.  20 freight wagons were built locally by Long & Co. of Youghal.  Long also built a director's saloon carriage, named Crinoline.  By the time of takeover the C&YR had accumulated 25 passenger carriages and 29 wagons, all of which passed to the GS&WR.

The Railway magazine note the GS&WR used the  tank locomotives designed by Alexander McDonnell in 1883 as the preferred locomotive for the lines.

The second half of the 1950s seen the replacement of steam locomotives with diesel locomotives and railcars.  The lines are currently worked by diesel railcars as part of the Cork Suburban Rail services.

Services
The regular general service for the line remained fairly constant at about five scheduled services each way to Youghal, supplemented by freight and special trains.  The Cobh branch has typically had an hourly service since 1863.

Accidents
The line has been relatively free of accidents.  The most serious was a collision at Summerhill in which over 100 people were injured, though without fatalities, where a train ran through a signal on 9 July 1882.  The derailment of a MacDonald  at points may have been due to the wheel profiles being rather sharp and the track being slightly out of gauge.  A more recent accident was the overrun of a General Motors Diesel into the part of the Cobh station converted into a heritage centre - there were no injuries but one outcome was locomotives were required to have working speedometers or be retired from service until fixed.

References

Notes

Footnotes

Sources
 
 
 
 
 
 
 
 
 
 
 
 
 
 
 
 
 
 
 

Irish gauge railways